This is the list of roads in Muzaffargarh. N-70 National Highway is major road go through city.

Along with Motorways

Other populated roads

See also 
 List of places in Muzaffargarh

References

External links 

Muzaffargarh
Transport in Muzaffargarh
Buildings and structures in Muzaffargarh
Roads in Muzaffargarh
Muzaffargarh
Muzaffargarh-related lists